Lequincio Zeefuik (born 26 November 2004) is a Dutch professional footballer who plays a forward for Eredivisie side FC Volendam.

Career
Having joined the youth academy of FC Volendam in 2017, he signed his first professional contract with the club in April 2021, lasting for three years. He scored on his debut for the club on 25 April 2021 at the age of 16 years and 150 days, making him the youngest player to score during his professional debut in Dutch football since Henk Vos in 1984.

Personal life
He is the brother of fellow footballers Deyovaisio Zeefuik and Género Zeefuik.

Career statistics

References

External links

2004 births
Living people
Footballers from Amsterdam
Dutch footballers
Association football forwards
FC Volendam players
Eerste Divisie players
Dutch people of Surinamese descent